Hing may refer to:

 Asafoetida, a spice derived from the plant Ferula assa-foetida
 Hing (surname)

People with the given name Hing include:
 Hing Tong (1922–2007), American mathematician
 Lew Hing (1858–1934), American businessman

See also
 
 Donald Hings (1907–2004), Canadian inventor
 John Hings (1910–1999), English cricketer
 Hinge (disambiguation)